This is a list of football (soccer) clubs in the Turks and Caicos Islands.

 AFC Academy
 AFC National
 Beaches FC
 Caribbean All Stars FC
 Celtic FC Providenciales
 Cheshire Hall
 Cost Right FC
 Digi FC
 HAB FC
 KPMG United FC
 Masters FC
 Pedagogue FC
 Provo Haitian Stars FC
 Provopool FC
 PWC Athletic
 RMC Master Hammer FC
 SWA Sharks FC
 Tropic All Stars

Turks and Caicos Islands
 
Football clubs